Eupeodes nielseni is a Palearctic hoverfly.

Description

It resembles Eupeodes luniger and other Eupeodes. Determination is problematic. Key references are Haarto, A. & Kerppola, S. (2007) and Bartsch, H., Binkiewicz, E., Rådén, A. & Nasibov, E. (2009). The male terminalia are figured by Dusek and Laska (1976). The adult insect is illustrated in colour by Stubbs and Falk (1983) and Torp (1994). The larva is described and figured by Rotheray (1994).

It is found from Fennoscandia south to the Pyrenees and Alps and from Britain eastwards through Northern and Central Europe into European Russia in Pinus forest from May to August. The larvae feed on Pinus aphids.

References

External links
 Images representing Eupeodes nielseni

Diptera of Europe
Syrphini
Insects described in 1976